Ilias Bulaid (born May 1, 1995) is a Moroccan-Dutch kickboxer and mixed martial artist. Ilias was the 2016 K-1 World Super Lightweight Tournament Runner-Up, and is the former Enfusion 67 kg World Champion.

He was first ranked as a top ten Featherweight by Combat Press in January 2016, and was last ranked in the top ten in August 2019, before being dropped from the rankings in September 2019.

Kickboxing career

Enfusion

Early career
Bulaid made his professional debut against Angelo Campoli at The Night of Kick and Punch 4°edizione on November 30, 2014. He won the fight by decision. Bulaid won his next fight fights as well, one by stoppage, before facing Piotr Kobylański at KOK in Gdańsk on October 17, 2014. He won this KOK debut by unanimous decision. Bulaid made his K-1 debut against Taito in the reserve match of the K-1 World GP 2014 -65kg Championship Tournament on November 3, 2014. He won the fight by a third-round technical knockout.

Enfusion champion
Bulaid amassed an 8–0 record in the first year of his professional career, which earned him the right to face Zaid Zairov for the vacant Enfusion 67 kg title at Enfusion Live 23 on December 20, 2014. He won the fight by a second-round knockout, stopping Zairov with a step-in knee.

Bulaid faced the reigning Krush welterweight champion Masaaki Noiri in a non-title bout at Krush 51 on February 6, 2015. Noiri handed Bulaid his first professional loss, as he won the fight by unanimous decision, with all three judges scoring the fight 30–27 in his favor.

After beating Maxim Federkov by a third-round knockout at Enfusion Live 29 on May 24, 2015, Bulaid was booked to make his first Enfusion title defense.. He faced Simón Santana in the main event of Enfusion Live 30 on July 11, 2015. Bulaid won the fight by a first-round knockout, needing just 67 seconds to stop Santana.

Bulaid faced the two-sport ISKA welterweight champion David Mejia in a non-title bout at Enfusion Live 32 on October 10, 2015. He won the fight by decision.

Bulaid made his second Enfusion title defense against Edye Ruiz at Enfusion Live 34 on November 21, 2015. He won the fight by unanimous decision.

Bulaid faced Edson Fortes in a non-title bout at Enfusion Live #37 on February 27, 2016. He won the fight by decision.

K-1 and WLF

K-1 Super Lightweight Grand Prix
Bulaid faced the reigning K-1 super lightweight champion and the 2014 K-1 World GP World Tournament Champion Kaew Fairtex at K-1 World GP 2016 -60kg Japan Tournament on April 24, 2016. He lost the fight by unanimous decision. Despite this loss, Buliad took part in the K-1 World GP 2016 -65kg World Tournament, which took place on June 24, 2016.

Bulaid was booked to face Chris Mauceri in the tournament quarterfinals. He made quick work of his opponent, knocking him down twice fifty seconds into the second round, which resulted in a technical knockout victory for him under the K-1 tournament rules. Bulaid advanced to the semifinals, where he faced the former Krush lightweight and super lightweight champion Hideaki Yamazaki. He won the fight by split decision, after an extra fourth round was fought. Bulaid faced Kaew Fairtex in the tournament finals, to whom he had lost just two months prior. Bulaid lost the rematch by a second-round technical knockout.

Kunlun Fight
Bulaid faced the 2016 WLF World 8 Man Tournament champion Qiu Jianliang at Glory of Heroes 5 on October 1, 2016. He lost the fight by unanimous decision.

Bulaid made his third Enfusion title defense against Zakaria Zouggary at Enfusion Live 46 on February 18, 2017. He won the fight by decision. Bulaid's next fight took place in Netherlands as well, as he was booked to face Manaowan Sitsongpeenong at Fight League 6 on May 13, 2017. He won the fight by a first-round knockout.

Bulaid participated in the 2017 Kunlun Fight 67 kg tournament, and faced Jordan Kranio in the first round of the tournament, at Kunlun Fight 65 - Kunlun Fight 16 Man Tournament on August 27, 2017. He won the fight by a first-round knockout and advanced to the quarterfinals where he faced Petchtanong Banchamek. Despite winning the fight by unanimous decision, Bulaid was forced to withdraw from the tournament due to injury.

Wu Lin Feng
Bulaid took part in the Wu Lin Feng 2018 World Championship in Tianjin, which took place on March 3, 2018. He faced Xie Lei in the quarterfinals of the one-day tournament. Bulaid won the fight by unanimous decision, and faced countryman Hasan Toy in the semifinals. Toy won the fight by split decision.

Bulaid faced Wei Ninghui at Wu Lin Feng 2019: WLF -67kg World Cup 2019-2020 1st Group Stage on June 29, 2019. He won the fight by a third-round knockout. Bulaid next faced Jia Aoqi at Wu Lin Feng 2019: WLF -67kg World Cup 2019-2020 3rd Group Stage on August 31, 2019. He lost the fight by unanimous decision, after an extra round was fought.

Mixed martial arts career

Bellator MMA
Bulaid signed his first MMA contract with Bellator MMA, and made his professional debut in September 2019, during Bellator 227 against Vitalic Maiboroda. Bulaid won the fight by a first round KO.

Bulaid made his second appearance with Bellator at Bellator 240 on February 22, 2020, when he faced Diego Freitas. Bulaid won the fight by unanimous decision.

Bulaid faced Georges Sasu at Bellator 270 on November 5, 2021. He won the bout via split decision.

Bulaid was scheduled to face Weber Almeida at Bellator 284 on August 12, 2022. In July, the bout was scrapped due to unknown reasons.

Titles
K-1
2016 K-1 World GP 2016 -65kg World Tournament Runner-Up
Enfusion
2014 Enfusion World 67 kg  Championship
Three successful title defenses

Mixed martial arts record

|-
|Win
|align=center|3–0
|Georges Sasu
|Decision (split)
|Bellator 270
|
|align=center|3
|align=center|5:00
|Dublin, Ireland
|
|-
|Win
|align=center|2–0
|Diego Freitas
|Decision (unanimous)
|Bellator 240
|
|align=center|3
|align=center|5:00
|Dublin, Ireland
|
|-
|Win
|align=center|1–0
|Vitalic Maiboroda
|KO (knee)
|Bellator 227
|
|align=center|1
|align=center|4:59
|Dublin, Ireland
|
|-
|}

Professional kickboxing record

|-  bgcolor="#FFBBBB"
| 2019-08-31|| Loss||align=left| Jia Aoqi || Wu Lin Feng 2019: WLF -67kg World Cup 2019-2020 3rd Group Stage || Zhengzhou, China || Ext.R Decision (Unanimous)|| 4 || 3:00 || 25–6
|-
|-  bgcolor="#CCFFCC"
| 2019-06-29|| Win ||align=left| Wei Ninghui|| Wu Lin Feng 2019: WLF -67kg World Cup 2019-2020 1st Group Stage || Zhengzhou, China || KO (Straight Right to the Body) || 3 || 1:11 || 25–5
|-
|-  bgcolor="#CCFFCC"
| 2018-09-15|| Win ||align=left| Youssef El Haji  || Enfusion Live 70 || Belgium || Decision (Unanimous) || 3 || 3:00 || 24–5
|-
|-  bgcolor="#FFBBBB" 
| 2018-03-03|| Loss ||align=left| Hasan Toy || Wu Lin Feng 2018: World Championship Tianjin -67kg Contender Tournament Final || Tianjin, China || Decision (Split) || 3 || 3:00 || 23–5
|-
|-  bgcolor="#CCFFCC"
| 2018-03-03|| Win ||align=left| Xie Lei  || Wu Lin Feng 2018: World Championship Tianjin -67kg Contender Tournament Semi Final || Tianjin, China || Decision (Unanimous) || 3 || 3:00 || 23–4
|-
|-  bgcolor="#CCFFCC"
| 2017-11-12 || Win ||align=left| Petchtanong Banchamek || Kunlun Fight 67 - 66kg World Championship, Quarter Finals || Sanya, China || Decision (Unanimous) || 3 || 3:00  || 22–4
|-
! style=background:white colspan=9 |
|-  
|-  bgcolor="#CCFFCC"
| 2017-08-27 || Win || align=left| Jordan Kranio ||Kunlun Fight 65 - Kunlun Fight 16 Man Tournament 67 kg- Final 16|| Qingdao, China|| KO (Left Body Hook) || 1 || 2:25 || 21–4
|-  
|-  bgcolor="#CCFFCC"
| 2017-05-13|| Win || align=left| Manaowan Sitsongpeenong ||Fight League 6|| Hoofddorp, Netherlands|| KO (Spinning Back Kick to The Body) || 1 || 1:30 || 20–4
|- 
|-  bgcolor="#CCFFCC"
| 2017-02-18|| Win ||align=left| Zakaria Zouggary || Enfusion Live 46 || Eindhoven, Netherlands || Decision  || 5 || 3:00 || 19–4
|-
! style=background:white colspan=9 |
|-  
|-  bgcolor="#CCFFCC"
| 2016-12-03 || Win|| align=left| Xie Lei || Wu Lin Feng 2016: WLF x Krush - China vs Japan|| Zhengzhou, China || Decision (Unanimous) || 3 || 3:00 || 18–4
|-  
|-  bgcolor="#FFBBBB" 
| 2016-10-01 || Loss|| align=left| Qiu Jianliang || Glory of Heroes 5 || Zhengzhou, China || Decision (Unanimous) || 3 || 3:00 || 17–4
|-  
|-  bgcolor="#CCFFCC"
| 2016-08-01 || Win|| align=left| Wang Fangkun || SAK || Japan || KO (Left Body Knee) || 2 || 2:06 || 17–3
|-  
|-  bgcolor="#FFBBBB" 
| 2016-06-24 || Loss|| align=left| Kaew Fairtex || K-1 World GP 2016 -65kg World Tournament, Final || Tokyo, Japan || TKO (Knee to the body) || 2 || 2:26 || 16–3
|-
! style=background:white colspan=9 |
|-  
|-  bgcolor="#CCFFCC"
| 2016-06-24 || Win || align=left| Hideaki Yamazaki|| K-1 World GP 2016 -65kg World Tournament, Semi Finals || Tokyo, Japan || Extra Round Decision (Split) || 4 || 3:00 || 16–2
|-  
|-  bgcolor="#CCFFCC"
| 2016-06-24 || Win || align=left| Chris Mauceri || K-1 World GP 2016 -65kg World Tournament, Quarter Finals || Tokyo, Japan || KO (Left Body Hook) || 2 || 0:50 || 15–2
|- 
|-  bgcolor="#FFBBBB" 
|  2016-04-24 || Loss || align=left| Kaew Fairtex || K-1 World GP 2016 -60kg Japan Tournament || Tokyo, Japan || Decision (unanimous) || 3 || 3:00 || 14–2
|- 
|-  bgcolor="#CCFFCC"
| 2016-02-27|| Win ||align=left| Edson Fortes  || Enfusion Live #37 || Eindhoven, Netherlands || Decision  || 3 || 3:00 || 14–1
|- 
|-  bgcolor="#CCFFCC"
| 2015-11-21|| Win ||align=left| Edye Ruiz || Enfusion Live 34 || Groningen, Netherlands || Decision (Unanimous) || 5 || 3:00 || 13–1
|-
! style=background:white colspan=9 |
|- 
|-  bgcolor="#CCFFCC"
| 2015-10-10|| Win ||align=left| David Mejia || Enfusion Live 32 || Belgium || Decision || 3 || 3:00 || 12–1
|- 
|-  bgcolor="#CCFFCC"
| 2015-07-11 || Win ||align=left| Simón Santana || Enfusion Live 30 || Dublin, Ireland || KO (Left High Knee) || 1 || 1:07 || 11–1
|-
! style=background:white colspan=9 |
|- 
|-  bgcolor="#CCFFCC"
| 2015-05-24|| Win ||align=left| Maxim Federkov || Enfusion Live 29|| Netherlands || TKO (Referee Stoppage/Left Body Hook) || 3 || 0:20 || 10–1
|- 
|-  bgcolor="#FFBBBB" 
| 2015-02-06 || Loss ||align=left| Masaaki Noiri || Krush 51 || Tokyo, Japan || Decision (unanimous) || 3 || 3:00 || 9–1
|- 
|-  bgcolor="#CCFFCC"
| 2014-12-20|| Win ||align=left| Zaid Zairov || Enfusion Live 23 || Antwerp, Belgium || KO (Left High Knee) || 2 || 1:18 || 9–0
|-
! style=background:white colspan=9 |
|-
|-  bgcolor="#CCFFCC"
| 2014-11-03 || Win || align=left| Taito || K-1 World GP 2014 -65kg Championship Tournament, Reserve Fight|| Tokyo, Japan || TKO (Referee Stoppage/Left High Knee) || 3 || 2:30 || 8–0
|-  
|-  bgcolor="#CCFFCC"
| 2014-10-17|| Win || align=left| Piotr Kobylański || KOK in Gdańsk ||Poland || Decision (Unanimous) || 3 || 3:00 || 7–0
|- 
|-  bgcolor="#CCFFCC"
| 2014-10-04|| Win ||align=left| Mark Vogel || Enfusion Live 21 || Germany || Decision  || 3 || 3:00 || 6–0
|- 
|-  bgcolor="#CCFFCC"
| 2014-06-29|| Win ||align=left|  Regis Sugden || Enfusion Live 19|| England || Decision (Unanimous)  || 3 || 3:00 || 5–0
|-
|-  bgcolor="#CCFFCC"
| 2014-03-23|| Win || align=left| Paul Norton  || Enfusion Live|| Ireland || TKO (Three Knockdowns/Left High Knee) || 1 || 2:59 || 4–0
|-
|-  bgcolor="#CCFFCC"
| 2014-02-22|| Win || align=left| Reda Aoulad Ben Said  || Enfusion Live 14|| Netherlands || Decision (Unanimous) || 3 || 3:00 || 3–0
|-
|-  bgcolor="#CCFFCC"
| 2014-01-25|| Win || align=left| Jackie Dings || Enfusion Live|| Netherlands || Decision (Unanimous) || 5 || 3:00 || 2–0
|-
|-  bgcolor="#CCFFCC"
| 2013-11-30|| Win || align=left| Angelo Campoli || The Night of Kick and Punch 4°edizione|| Italy || Decision || 3 || 3:00 || 1–0
|-
| colspan=9 | Legend:

See also
 List of male kickboxers
 List of male mixed martial artists

References

Living people
1995 births
Dutch male kickboxers
Moroccan male kickboxers
Kunlun Fight kickboxers
Featherweight kickboxers
Sportspeople from North Brabant